Deh Hasan or Deh-e Hasan or Dehhasan may refer to:
 Deh-e Hasan, Markazi
 Deh-e Hasan, Dust Mohammad, Sistan and Baluchestan Province
 Deh-e Hasan, Jahanabad, Sistan and Baluchestan Province
 Deh Hasan, Tehran